Wullen is a city-district of Witten-Annen, which is a part of the City of Witten, (North Rhine-Westphalia, Germany). Wullen is placed about 3 kilometres northeast of the City of Witten.

History
 1019: First mentioned.
 1809: French soldiers occupy the village, with other villages of the area it became part of the "Mairie Witten".
 1885: Incorporation with the "Landkreis Hoerde"
 1929: Incorporation with Witten.
 1991–1993: The campus of the Witten/Herdecke University was built in Wullen.

External links
 uni-wh.de, official website of the university (German)

Witten